Batkoa major is a naturally occurring fungus.

Little is known about the pathogen. Found in the soil and belonging to the entomopathogenic fungi, the fungus spores attaches to the insects' bodies upon contact. The fungus then enters the insect’s body through weak spots in the outer cuticle or skin. The fungus then forms rhizoids to anchor its dying host to a tree, as spores start to develop on the insect's outer body and short-lived infective spores are ejected. The host insect dies between 4 - 7 days after being infected.
Traces of the infective spores are hard to find in the environment.

The fungus has been studied as an environmentally-friendly insecticide to control pests such as the invasive spotted lanternfly (Lycorma delicatula) in north-eastern North America. Other known targets include the pine beauty moth and the potato leafhopper.

See also 
 Beauveria bassiana

Bibliography 

 Collection of Entomopathogenic Fungal Cultures : Catalog of Strains - (Humber, Richard A. United States. Agricultural Research Service)

References 

Fungi articles needing expert attention
Fungal pest control agents
Entomophthorales
Fungi described in 1888